John E. Lloyd, (born 1902) known as Eddie Lloyd was an English professional footballer who played as a left half.

Career
Lloyd played for North Ormesby Nomads, Stockton, Middlesbrough, Bradford City and Derry City. For Bradford City, he made 157 appearances in the Football League; he also made 6 FA Cup appearances.

Sources

References

1902 births
Year of death missing
English footballers
Stockton F.C. players
Middlesbrough F.C. players
Bradford City A.F.C. players
Derry City F.C. players
English Football League players
Association football midfielders